Lawrence Lee Thomas (born January 25, 1969), also known as Pooh-Man, MC Pooh and MC Pooh-Man, is an American rap artist who has released several albums on various labels, including Jive Records. His lyrics focused on the topics of sex, money and murder (his song "Sex, Money & Murder" appeared on the soundtrack to the 1992 film Juice). He also had a small role in the film Menace II Society, playing Doc.

He has been active in the music industry since the early 1990s onward. His only charting album, 1992's Funky as I Wanna Be, gained notoriety for its risque cover, featured guest appearances by MC Breed, Too Short and Ant Banks and brought him his biggest success, peaking at #158 on the Billboard Top 200.

On February 28, 2000, Thomas pleaded guilty to one count of bank robbery and was sentenced to 6 years in prison.

Discography

References

External links
MusicMatch profile for Pooh-Man

1969 births
Living people
21st-century American rappers
21st-century American male musicians
African-American male rappers
American people convicted of robbery
American prisoners and detainees
Gangsta rappers
G-funk artists
Jive Records artists
Place of birth missing (living people)
Rappers from the San Francisco Bay Area
West Coast hip hop musicians
21st-century African-American musicians
20th-century African-American people